Brigantine (or simply The Island) is a city in Atlantic County in the U.S. state of New Jersey. As of the 2020 United States Census, the city's population was 7,716, a decrease of 1,734 (−18.3%) from the 2010 census count of 9,450, which in turn reflected a decline of 3,144 (−25.0%) from the 12,594 counted in the 2000 census.

What is now the City of Brigantine has passed through a series of names and re-incorporations since it was first created. The area was originally incorporated as Brigantine Beach Borough by an act of the New Jersey Legislature on June 14, 1890, from portions of Galloway Township, based on the results of a referendum held on June 3, 1890. On April 23, 1897, the area was reincorporated as the City of Brigantine City. This name lasted until April 9, 1914, when it was renamed the City of East Atlantic City. On March 16, 1924, Brigantine was incorporated as a city, replacing East Atlantic City and incorporating further portions of Galloway Township. The borough was named for the many shipwrecks in the area, including those of brigantines.

New Jersey Monthly magazine ranked Brigantine as its 36th best place to live in its 2008 rankings of the "Best Places To Live" in New Jersey. NJ.com designated Brigantine fourth in its rankings of "The 25 best Jersey Shore towns, ranked" in 2021.

Geography 
According to the U.S. Census Bureau, the city had a total area of 10.86 square miles (28.14 km2), including 6.52 square miles (16.89 km2) of land and 4.34 square miles (11.25 km2) of water (39.98%). Brigantine is located on Brigantine Island.

The only road to and from Brigantine is New Jersey Route 87, locally known as Brigantine Boulevard. The Justice Vincent S. Haneman Memorial Bridge is the only way on and off the island. The original bridge to the island that was constructed in 1924 was destroyed in the Great Atlantic Hurricane of 1944. The current bridge was constructed in 1972.

The city borders the Atlantic County municipalities of Atlantic City and Galloway Township.

Demographics

2010 census 

The Census Bureau's 2006–2010 American Community Survey showed that (in 2010 inflation-adjusted dollars) median household income was $62,212 (with a margin of error of +/− $7,472) and the median family income was $79,318 (+/− $7,962). Males had a median income of $55,595 (+/− $5,655) versus $42,622 (+/− $5,179) for females. The per capita income for the borough was $36,571 (+/− $3,305). About 5.9% of families and 7.6% of the population were below the poverty line, including 8.7% of those under age 18 and 3.9% of those age 65 or over.

2000 census 
As of the 2000 United States census there were 12,594 people, 5,473 households, and 3,338 families residing in the city. The racial makeup of the city was 83.15% White, 3.94% African American, 0.18% Native American, 5.72% Asian, 0.05% Pacific Islander, 4.67% from other races, and 2.29% from two or more races. Hispanic or Latino of any race were 9.41% of the population.

There were 5,473 households, out of which 24.0% had children under the age of 18 living with them, 44.9% were married couples living together, 11.7% had a female householder with no husband present, and 39.0% were non-families. 30.7% of all households were made up of individuals, and 9.9% had someone living alone who was 65 years of age or older. The average household size was 2.30 and the average family size was 2.89.

In the city the population was spread out, with 20.8% under the age of 18, 5.8% from 18 to 24, 30.9% from 25 to 44, 25.9% from 45 to 64, and 16.6% who were 65 years of age or older. The median age was 41 years. For every 100 females, there were 95.1 males. For every 100 females age 18 and over, there were 92.4 males.

The median income for a household in the city was $44,639, and the median income for a family was $51,679. Males had a median income of $40,523 versus $29,779 for females. The per capita income for the city was $23,950. About 7.6% of families and 9.4% of the population were below the poverty line, including 15.9% of those under age 18 and 7.2% of those age 65 or over.

Points of interest 

 Brigantine Lighthouse – Constructed by the Island Development Real Estate Company in 1926 as part of an effort to attract residents to the island, the structure was too far from shore and too low to be used as a functioning lighthouse and has been used over the years as headquarters for the Brigantine Police Department, as a museum and as a gift shop, in addition to be a central identifying symbol of the city.
 Marine Mammal Stranding Center – Established in 1978 as the state's only marine stranding center, the center rehabilitates and releases stranded marine mammals and sea turtles, rescuing more than 3,900 whales, dolphins, seals and sea turtles since it was formed.
 Part of the Edwin B. Forsythe National Wildlife Refuge is located on the northern end of Brigantine Island. The Refuge provides crucial habitat for many different types of endangered or threatened birds, including the American bald eagle, peregrine falcon, American black duck, and the piping plover.
 The Brigantine Hotel, still standing on the Atlantic coast side of the island, was an early integrated hotel starting in the 1940s, and was owned for a period by Father Divine's International Peace Mission movement. African American entrepreneur Sarah Spencer Washington acquired the hotel in the 1940s from Father Divine and created the area's first integrated beach area. The facility is now known as Legacy Vacation Resorts Brigantine Beach.

Government

Local government 
Since 1989, the City of Brigantine has been governed within the Faulkner Act (formally known as the Optional Municipal Charter Law) under the Council-Manager form (Plan 5), implemented by direct petition effective as of January 1, 1991. The city is one of 42 municipalities (of the 564) statewide that use this form of government. The governing body is comprised of the Mayor (elected at large), two at-large council members and four ward council members, all of whom serve terms of office of four years. The mayor and the two at-large council seats come up for vote as part of the November general election in leap years, with the four ward seats up for vote simultaneously two years later. The Mayor presides over the meetings of the City Council. The Council adopts the municipal budget and enacts ordinances to promote and ensure the security, health, government and protection of the City and its residents.

, the Mayor of Brigantine is Republican Vince Sera, who was elected to serve the balance of the term of office ending December 31, 2022, that had been held by Andy Simpson until his death. Members of the City Council are Karen Bew (R, 2024; Ward 1), Rick DeLucry (D, 2024; Ward 4), Dennis Haney (R, 2024; Ward 3), Neal Kane (R, 2022; At-Large – elected to serve an unexpired term), Paul Lettieri (R, 2024; Ward 2) and Michael Riordan (R, 2022; At-Large).

In September 2020, the city council appointed Vince Sera as mayor to fill the seat expiring in December 2022 that became vacant following the death of Andy Simpson the previous month. Later that month, Tom Kane was selected from a list of three candidates nominated by the Republican municipal committee to fill the at-large seat expiring in December 2022 that had been held by Sera until he took office as mayor.

In January 2019, the city council selected Paul Lettieri to fill the Ward 2 seat that had been held by Michael Riordan unil he vacated it to take the at-large seat he won in the November 2018 general election; Lettieri served on an interim basis until the November 2019 general election, when he was elected to serve the balance of the term of office.

In December 2015, John Withers IV was selected from three candidates nominated by the Democratic municipal committee to fill the Ward 3 seat expiring in December 2016 that had been vacated following the resignation of Joseph M. Picardi earlier that month.

Karen Bew was selected in January 2015 from among three candidates nominated by the Republican municipal committee to fill the Ward 1 seat that was vacated by Andrew Simpson when he took office in an at-large seat. In November 2015, she was elected to serve the balance of the term.

Federal, state and county representation 
Brigantine is located in the 2nd Congressional District and is part of New Jersey's 2nd state legislative district.

 

Atlantic County is governed by a directly elected county executive and a nine-member Board of County Commissioners, responsible for legislation. The executive serves a four-year term and the commissioners are elected to staggered three-year terms, of which four are elected from the county on an at-large basis and five of the commissioners represent equally populated districts. , Atlantic County's Executive is Republican Dennis Levinson, whose term of office ends December 31, 2023. Members of the Board of County Commissioners are:

Ernest D. Coursey, District 1, including Atlantic City (part), Egg Harbor Township (part), and Pleasantville (D, 2022, Atlantic City), Chair Maureen Kern, District 2, including Atlantic City (part), Egg Harbor Township (part), Linwood, Longport, Margate City, Northfield, Somers Point and Ventnor City (R, 2024, Somers Point), Andrew Parker III, District 3, including Egg Harbor Township (part) and Hamilton Township (part) (R, Egg Harbor Township, 2023), Richard R. Dase, District 4, including Absecon, Brigantine, Galloway Township and Port Republic (R, 2022, Galloway Township), James A. Bertino, District 5, including Buena, Buena Vista Township, Corbin City, Egg Harbor City, Estell Manor, Folsom, Hamilton Township (part), Hammonton, Mullica Township and Weymouth Township (R, 2018, Hammonton), Caren L. Fitzpatrick, At-Large (D, 2023, Linwood), Frank X. Balles, At-Large (R, Pleasantville, 2024) Amy L. Gatto, Freeholder (R, 2022, Hamilton Township) and Vice Chair John W. Risley, At-Large (R, 2023, Egg Harbor Township)

Atlantic County's constitutional officers are:
County Clerk Joesph J. Giralo (R, 2026, Hammonton),
Sheriff Eric Scheffler (D, 2024, Northfield) and
Surrogate James Curcio (R, 2025, Hammonton).

Politics 
As of March 23, 2011, there was a total of 6,430 registered voters in Brigantine City, of whom 1,219 (19.0% vs. 30.5% countywide) were registered as Democrats, 2,679 (41.7% vs. 25.2%) were registered as Republicans, and 2,524 (39.3% vs. 44.3%) were registered as Unaffiliated. There were 8 voters registered as Libertarians or Greens. Among the city's 2010 Census population, 68.0% (vs. 58.8% in Atlantic County) were registered to vote, including 81.4% of those ages 18 and over (vs. 76.6% countywide).

In the 2012 presidential election, Republican Mitt Romney received 2,462 votes (53.5% vs. 41.1% countywide), ahead of Democrat Barack Obama with 2,068 votes (44.9% vs. 57.9%) and other candidates with 49 votes (1.1% vs. 0.9%), among the 4,605 ballots cast by the city's 6,944 registered voters, for a turnout of 66.3% (vs. 65.8% in Atlantic County). In the 2008 presidential election, Republican John McCain received 2,652 votes (53.2% vs. 41.6% countywide), ahead of Democrat Barack Obama with 2,218 votes (44.5% vs. 56.5%) and other candidates with 67 votes (1.3% vs. 1.1%), among the 4,984 ballots cast by the city's 7,214 registered voters, for a turnout of 69.1% (vs. 68.1% in Atlantic County). In the 2004 presidential election, Republican George W. Bush received 2,627 votes (53.7% vs. 46.2% countywide), ahead of Democrat John Kerry with 2,181 votes (44.6% vs. 52.0%) and other candidates with 36 votes (0.7% vs. 0.8%), among the 4,888 ballots cast by the city's 6,847 registered voters, for a turnout of 71.4% (vs. 69.8% in the whole county).

In the 2013 gubernatorial election, Republican Chris Christie received 2,270 votes (73.2% vs. 60.0% countywide), ahead of Democrat Barbara Buono with 715 votes (23.1% vs. 34.9%) and other candidates with 35 votes (1.1% vs. 1.3%), among the 3,099 ballots cast by the city's 6,977 registered voters, yielding a 44.4% turnout (vs. 41.5% in the county). In the 2009 gubernatorial election, Republican Chris Christie received 1,877 votes (57.7% vs. 47.7% countywide), ahead of Democrat Jon Corzine with 1,147 votes (35.2% vs. 44.5%), Independent Chris Daggett with 173 votes (5.3% vs. 4.8%) and other candidates with 26 votes (0.8% vs. 1.2%), among the 3,255 ballots cast by the city's 6,632 registered voters, yielding a 49.1% turnout (vs. 44.9% in the county).

Education 
The Brigantine Public Schools serves students in pre-kindergarten through eighth grade. As of the 2018–19 school year, the district, comprised of two schools, had an enrollment of 563 students and 68.0 classroom teachers (on an FTE basis), for a student–teacher ratio of 8.3:1. The district's board of education is comprised of seven members who set policy and oversee the fiscal and educational operation of the district through its administration. As a Type I school district, the board's trustees are appointed by the Mayor to serve three-year terms of office on a staggered basis, with either two or three members up for reappointment each year. Of the more than 600 school districts statewide, Brigantine is one of 15 districts with appointed school districts. Schools in the district (with 2018–19 enrollment data from the National Center for Education Statistics) are
Brigantine Elementary School with 329 students in grades Pre-K–4 and
Brigantine North Middle School with 254 students in grades 5–8.

Students in public school for ninth through twelfth grades, along with those from Longport, Margate City and Ventnor City, attend Atlantic City High School in neighboring Atlantic City, as part of sending/receiving relationships with the Atlantic City School District. As of the 2018–19 school year, the high school had an enrollment of 1,796 students and 153.0 classroom teachers (on an FTE basis), for a student–teacher ratio of 11.7:1.

City public school students are also eligible to attend the Atlantic County Institute of Technology in the Mays Landing section of Hamilton Township or the Charter-Tech High School for the Performing Arts, located in Somers Point.

Transportation

Roads and highways 

Constructed in 1972, the Brigantine Bridge is a vehicular bridge over Absecon Inlet, providing the only road access to Brigantine Island; formally known as the Justice Vincent S. Haneman Memorial Bridge, it carries Route 87.

Public transportation 
NJ Transit provides bus service to and from Atlantic City on the 501 route.

Climate 
According to the Köppen climate classification system, Brigantine, New Jersey has a humid subtropical climate (Cfa) with hot, moderately humid summers, cool winters and year-around precipitation. Cfa climates are characterized by all months having an average mean temperature > 32.0 °F (> 0.0 °C), at least four months with an average mean temperature ≥ 50.0 °F (≥ 10.0 °C), at least one month with an average mean temperature ≥ 71.6 °F (≥ 22.0 °C) and no significant precipitation difference between seasons. During the summer months in Brigantine, a cooling afternoon sea breeze is present on most days, but episodes of extreme heat and humidity can occur with heat index values ≥ 95 °F (≥ 35 °C). During the winter months, episodes of extreme cold and wind can occur with wind chill values < 0 °F (< −18 °C). The plant hardiness zone at Brigantine Beach is 7b with an average annual extreme minimum air temperature of 7.3 °F (−13.7 °C).

Ecology 
According to the A. W. Kuchler U.S. potential natural vegetation types, Brigantine, New Jersey would have a dominant vegetation type of Northern Cordgrass (73) with a dominant vegetation form of Coastal Prairie (20).

Notable people 

People who were born in, residents of, or otherwise closely associated with Brigantine include:

 Ray Birdwhistell (1918–1994), anthropologist who founded kinesics as a field of inquiry and research
 Dan Borislow (1961–2014), entrepreneur, sports team owner, inventor and thoroughbred horse breeder
 Mark A. Brown (born 1961), gaming industry executive who has been CEO of Trump Hotels and Casinos Inc. and President of The Venetian Macao, Sands Macao and The Four Seasons Macau
 Angelo Coia (1938–2013), football end who played in the NFL for the Chicago Bears, the Washington Redskins and the Atlanta Falcons
 Vincent S. Haneman (1902–1978), Associate Justice of New Jersey Supreme Court 1960 to 1971, served eight years as Brigantine's mayor
 Amy Kennedy (born 1978), educator, mental health advocate and politician who is the Democratic Party nominee in the 2020 elections seeking to represent New Jersey's 2nd congressional district
 Brett Kennedy (born 1994), pitcher for the San Diego Padres of Major League Baseball
 Patrick J. Kennedy (born 1967), former member of United States House of Representatives
 Brittany Lee Lewis (born 1990), professor, television personality, domestic violence advocate, Miss Delaware 2014 and Miss Black America 2017
 Guy Marks (1923–1987), actor, comedian, singer and impressionist, familiar face on TV sitcoms and variety shows of 1960s and 1970s
 Harry Olivieri (1916–2006), co-creator of the Philly cheesesteak and owner of Pat's King of Steaks
 Carol Plum-Ucci (born 1957), young adult novelist and essayist
 John Rosenbaum (1934–2003), California artist and educator
 Katherine Shindle (born 1977), actress, singer, dancer and AIDS activist who was Miss America 1998 and Miss Illinois 1997
 Slappy White (1921–1995), comedian and actor

References

External links 

Brigantine City website
Brigantine Public Schools

School Data for the Brigantine Public Schools, National Center for Education Statistics
The Brigantine Beachcomber Newspaper
History of Brigantine Castle (defunct amusement pier)
Brigantine Excursion House from the Sea, October 17, 1891 by D.J. Kennedy, Historical Society of Pennsylvania
End View of Brigantine Beach, Excursion House, New Jersey, October 17, 1891 by D.J. Kennedy, Historical Society of Pennsylvania

 
1890 establishments in New Jersey
Cities in Atlantic County, New Jersey
Faulkner Act (council–manager)
Jersey Shore communities in Atlantic County
Populated places established in 1890